Why We Suck: A Feel Good Guide to Staying Fat, Loud, Lazy and Stupid is a 2008 book written by actor and comedian Denis Leary.

Overview
Leary is credited on the book cover as "Dr. Denis Leary", a reference to a joke from his 1993 stand-up special, No Cure for Cancer. During the show he mentions he wants to write a self-help book entitled "Shut the Fuck Up, by Dr. Denis Leary", with the "advice" being telling the people seeking help the one thing no one has ever told them to do ("shut the fuck up"), which he believes would help people more than actual advice.

Leary also uses the "Doctor" title because of an honorary doctorate bestowed upon him by his alma mater Emerson College.  "Sure it's just a celebrity type of thing-they only gave it to me because I'm famous." Leary jokes. "But it's legal and it means I get to say I'm a doctor just like Dr. Phil!" In the book, he  refers to Dr. Phil as "Dr. Full".

The book reached #7 on the New York Times Best Sellers list in December, 2008.

References

2008 non-fiction books
Comedy books